Sadhan Dutt (also spelt Sadhan Dutta) (1921-2008) was an Indian scientist and entrepreneur.

Life and career 

Born on 29 May 1921, he finished his school education at Guwahati and graduated in mechanical and electrical engineering from Indian Institute of Technology (BHU) Varanasi. He joined The Kuljian Corporation of Philadelphia as Manager for India in 1950. Later, he launched Kuljian Corporation (India), the first private sector consulting firm in India. In 1979, it emerged as Development Consultants.

He took an important role for the thermal power and nuclear power projects in the country. In addition to it he submitted the project report to the Central Government for the first Metro Railway projects in Kolkata.

Honours and awards

Dutt was honoured in his career. He received the Gold medal from Asiatic Society and the award of ‘Man of the year’ from New York Chamber of Commerce.

References

Bengali Hindus
20th-century Bengalis
Indian social workers
20th-century Indian engineers
Engineers from West Bengal
Businesspeople from Kolkata
1921 births
2008 deaths